Jordan Oliver Jr. (born June 18, 1999) is an American professional wrestler. He is best known for his work with Combat Zone Wrestling (CZW), where he was a one-time CZW Wired Champion. He is also known for his work with Major League Wrestling (MLW) and Game Changer Wrestling (GCW), where he is the current JCW World Champion in his first reign.

Professional wrestling career

Game Changer Wrestling (2017; 2019–present)
On December 30, 2017, at The Compound Fight Club: Chapter 1, Oliver made his debut for Game Changer Wrestling (GCW), in a five-way match, which was won by Matt Travis. He returned two years later at Crushed Up, and due to his style of wrestling, he has mainly appeared in scramble matches.

In March 2020, Oliver participated in the Acid Cup. He defeated fellow YDNB member Ellis Taylor in the first round, Nick Gage in the quarter-final, before falling to Blake Christian in the semi-final. In April 2021, he was again named a participant in the Acid Cup. He reached the final by defeating Edith Surreal in the first round, Brayden Lee in the second round and Cole Radrick in the semi-final. He won the tournament by defeating Lee Moriarty in the final. On May 1, at Ashes to Ashes, he unsuccessfully challenged Gage for the GCW World Title.

Combat Zone Wrestling (2018–2020)
Oliver was trained with Bronx Wrestling Federation and at the CZW Dojo, and spent 2017 working Dojo Wars shows. After his debut for Combat Zone Wrestling (CZW), he would continue to regularly make Dojo Wars appearances. On February 10, 2018, Oliver made his debut for CZW at Nineteen, in a 30-man rumble match, eventually won by Maxwell Jacob Friedman. Around this time, he formed Young Dumb N Broke, consisting of Charlie Tiger, Ellis Taylor, Griffin McCoy and McCoy's valet Valentina Vazquez. The stable often accompanied him to the ring and interfered in his matches. Represented by Oliver, Tiger and Taylor, the stable's first appearance was at New Heights, where they defeated the team of Brandon Kirk, D. J. Hyde and Kasey Catal and The Shook Crew (Bobby Orlando, Bryce Donovan and Max Caster). On September 8, at Down with the Sickness, Oliver earned his first title shot for the CZW Wired Championship, in a four-way match, which was won by Blackwater. On October 13, at the following event, Better than Our Best, Oliver defeated Blackwater for the CZW Wired Championship. One of his title defenses came against Andrew Everett, in which he performed a forward backflip off the top rope and caught Everett in midair. This match attracted the attention of Court Bauer, founder of Major League Wrestling (MLW), and would lead to Oliver signing for the promotion.

On April 13, 2019, Oliver participated in Best of the Best 18. In a first round four-way match, he defeated Matt Travis, Myron Reed and Sammy Guevara, only to lose in the semi-final against John Silver. On December 14, at Cage of Death XXI, he dropped the CZW Wired Championship to A. R. Fox, ending his reign at 427 days. Oliver was three days short of becoming the longest reigning champion, which was then held by Drew Gulak and has since been surpassed by KC Navarro. His final appearance for CZW came on March 21, 2020, at Saturday Night Special, where he unsuccessfully challenged Joe Gacy for the CZW World Championship, in a three-way match also involving Jimmy Lloyd.

Major League Wrestling (2019–2021)

On the April 24, 2019, episode of Fusion (taped April 4), Oliver made his debut for Major League Wrestling (MLW), defeating Kotto Brazil. He also appeared at Battle Riot II, where he took part in the 39-man Battle Riot match. He entered in at #5, but was eliminated by Ace Romero. On the June 22 episode of Fusion (taped June 1), Oliver cut a promo about crooked referees, before defeating Isaias Velázquez. On July 6, at Kings of Colosseum, he had allied himself with Myron Reed, and helped Reed defeat Rey Horus. Over the next couple of months, Oliver and the stable (now known as Injustice) would feud with the luchadores in the middleweight division. On the December 14 episode of Fusion (taped December 5), Oliver and Brazil refused to leave the ring due to being named alternates for the Opera Cup. This led to an impromptu match with King Mo and A. C. H., which they lost.

The storyline between Injustice and the luchadores continued well into the new year. On the January 25, 2020,  episode of Fusion (taped January 11), Drago and Puma King defeated Injustice, in a three-way match also involving Black Taurus and Low Rider. On the February 2 episode of Fusion (taped January 11), Oliver was ringside for Reed's middleweight title match with Drago, and interfered towards the end to help Reed retain the belt. At the same time, the stable also started feuding with Brian Pillman Jr., who made his presence known after Oliver and Brazil defeated Laredo Kid and Zenshi on the February 29 episode of Fusion (taped February 1). A singles match between Oliver and Pillman was scheduled on Fusion, but it was prevented from happening due to Injustice attacking Pillman. As a result, Injustice were suspended by MLW, and they returned on the May 2 episode of Fusion (taped March 13), unsuccessfully challenging Los Jinetes del Aire (El Hijo del Vikingo, Myzteziz Jr. and Octagon Jr.) for the AAA World Trios Championship.

Contra Unit attacked MLW at the end of the trios match with Brazil being taken out. Oliver, now a newly minted heavyweight, began calling out Contra Unit, specifically World Heavyweight Champion Jacob Fatu and Simon Gotch. On the August 6 episode of Pulp Fusion, Oliver was jumped by Gotch and put out with a chokehold. On the December 9 episode of Fusion, Oliver gained a measure of revenge, jumping Gotch during a schmoz ending to Contra Unit's World Tag Team Championship match against Marshall and Ross Von Erich. Although a grudge match between the two was scheduled for Kings of Colosseum, at the event it appeared that Gotch had no-showed and the match was postponed. However, this turned out to be a ruse, as later in the night and after Reed's latest title defense, Injustice were ambushed by Contra Unit. Following this, Oliver turned face, but on the January 20, 2021, episode of Fusion, Gotch defeated him by referee's decision. Later in the episode, Oliver and Reed disguised themselves as flag bearers and attacked Fatu and Daivari, before being chased off by Gotch and Mads Krügger. On the February 3 episode of Fusion, Oliver squashed a nameless member of the Sentai Death Squad. His match was bookended by two promos: the first with Reed challenging Contra Unit to a tag team match, and the second with Oliver warning Fatu that he was coming for his title. On the February 10 episode of Fusion, the tag team match ended up not happening as Fatu jumped Injustice, but Oliver and Reed managed to isolate Fatu and hit him with a superkick-springboard cutter combination, before being dragged away by officials. On the March 3 episode of Fusion, Oliver was defeated by Fatu, and afterwards, he and Reed were prevented from being put in Contra Unit's trademark body bags as Calvin Tankman ran in to make the save. On the March 11 episode of Fusion, Injustice challenged Los Parks (L. A. Park and El Hijo de L.A. Park) for the World Tag Team Championship; this was changed to a triple threat match on the March 18 episode of Fusion when Contra Unit attacked Injustice. Los Parks retained over Injustice and Contra Unit, with Oliver taking the pin. On March 31, at Never Say Never, Oliver defeated Gotch in a rematch of their January encounter, ending his and Injustice's feud with Contra Unit.

On July 10, at Battle Riot, Injustice interrupted César Durán and demanded another title shot for the World Tag Team Championship. After Oliver took offence with 5150 (Rivera and Slice Boogie) jumping the line in the tag division, the two stables began brawling, much to Durán's approval. In the 40-man Battle Riot match, Oliver entered in at #15 and immediately saved Reed from elimination. He and Reed eliminated 5150 by pulling the ropes down, but 5150 got back in the ring and eliminated them anyway, leading to another brawl. On the October 6 episode of Fusion: Alpha (taped July 10), Injustice were defeated by 5150, following interference by Julius Smokes, who hit Oliver with a loaded sock, allowing Rivera to roll him for the pin. On the October 14 episode of Fusion: Alpha (taped July 10), Oliver and Reed were cutting a promo in a car park when 5150 rolled up and attacked them. This proved to be Oliver's final appearance for MLW, as on October 27, he was released from his contract.

Championships and accomplishments
 Combat Zone Wrestling
 CZW Wired Championship (1 time)
 Extreme Chaos Wrestling
 Extreme Championship (1 time)
 Game Changer Wrestling
 JCW World Championship (1 time, current)
 Acid Cup (2021)
 Jersey J-Cup (2023)
 Grim's Toy Show 
 GTS Loser Belt Championship (1 time)
 GTS Intercontinental Championship (1 time)
 GTS Hardcore Championship (3 Times)
Pro Wrestling Illustrated 
Ranked No. 209 of the top 500 singles wrestlers in the PWI 500 in 2021
 Synergy Pro Wrestling
 Synergy Championship (1 time)
 Vanguard Championship Wrestling
 VCW Commonwealth Heritage Championship (1 time, current)

References

External links
MLW profile

1999 births
21st-century professional wrestlers
American male professional wrestlers
CZW Wired Champions
Living people
People from Suffern, New York
People from Newburgh, New York
Professional wrestlers from New York (state)